The  2020 Rising Phoenix World Championships was an IFBB Professional League Wings of Strength female professional bodybuilding competition that was held in conjunction with Arizona Women’s Pro and the NPC Wings of Strength Arizona Women’s Extravaganza. It was held on 5 December 2020 at the Talking Stick Resort in Scottsdale, Arizona, United States of America. It was the 6th Rising Phoenix World Championships to be held.

Results

Scorecard

Best poser award
1st - Andrea Shaw

Notable events
 Andrea Shaw, a dark horse competitor coming off her win at the 2020 Omaha Pro, dethroned reigning Ms. Rising Phoenix Helle Trevino and won her first Ms. Rising Phoenix title, along with the best poser award.
 Originally scheduled to be held on 5 September 2020 in Phoenix, Arizona, United States of America (USA), but due to the COVID-19 pandemic however it was rescheduled to 5 December 2020 in Las Vegas, Nevada, USA. The venue was later changed to Scottsdale, Arizona, USA due to COVID-19 restrictions on the capacity of audience attendance. This also lead to a massive decline in non-American residential competitors due to COVID-19 travel restrictions.
 This was the first Rising Phoenix World Championship to be demoted to the status as professional bodybuilding's 2nd most prestigious competition for female bodybuilding due to the restoration of the Ms. Olympia. Due to this change, it adopted a Ms. International style invitational application system, along with a Olympia Qualification System ranking on par with the Arnold Classic.

Prize money
Ms. Rising Phoenix
1st - $50,000 & Chevrolet Camaro
2nd - $25,000

Best poser award
1st - $5,000

Official competitors list

 Irene Anderson
 Jill Blondin
 Nicki Chartrand
 Patti Hanson
 Oana Hreapca
 Theresa Ivancik
 Monique Jones
 Natalia Kovaleva
 Janeen Lankowski
 Silvia Matta
 LaDawn McDay
 Kristina Mendoza
 Yaxeni Oriquen
 Mona Poursaleh
 Virginia Sanchez
 Andrea Shaw
 Helle Trevino
 Aleesha Young
 Margita Zamolova

External links 
 Official homepage

References

Rising Phoenix World Championships
Wings of Strength
History of female bodybuilding
Female professional bodybuilding competitions